The Shade (Richard Swift) is a comic book character developed in the 1940s for National Comics, first appearing in the pages of Flash Comics in a story titled "The Man Who Commanded the Night", scripted by Gardner Fox and illustrated by Hal Sharp. Debuting as a villain, the Shade was best known for fighting against two generations of superheroes, most notably the Golden Age and Silver Age versions of the Flash. He eventually became a mentor for Jack Knight, the son of the Golden Age Starman, Ted Knight, a hero the Shade had also fought.

Though portrayed in Silver Age comics as a thief with a cane that could manipulate shadows, the character was reinvented in 1994 as a morally ambiguous Victorian-era immortal who gained the ability to manipulate shadows and immortality from an unexplained mystical event. In 2009, the Shade was ranked as IGN's 89th-greatest villain of all time.

The Shade appeared as a major character from the season 1 finale onwards in Stargirl, played by Jonathan Cake.

Character inspiration
Charles Dickens' story The Old Curiosity Shop features an English rake also named Richard, and a dwarf named Quilp. In continuity, it is suggested that Shade's story inspired Dickens to write The Old Curiosity Shop. James Robinson has stated that he drew some inspiration for the Shade's mannerisms and speech patterns from the British stage and screen actor Jonathan Pryce.

Shade got a solo series in late 2011, written by Robinson and drawn by Cully Hamner, which dealt with Shade and his descendants, flashing back to various points in his life as he travelled the globe trying to find who is behind a plot to kill him.

Fictional character biography
The 'Shade' draws his alias from Dante Alighieri's epic poem The Divine Comedy, specifically its first book, Inferno, which describes the Nine Rings of Hell. This poem is the most cited depiction of Hell, and the various characters in the story referred to as "the Shade" are references to the perpetual darkness of Hell itself. The comic book villain "the Shade" uses his power of perpetual night to cast a blanket of darkness over various parts of the world.

Pre-Crisis
The Shade was introduced in Flash Comics #33, as a villain for the original Flash, Jay Garrick. He was portrayed in his first and only Golden Age appearance as a thief with a machine that caused darkness by removing light-reflecting dust particles; in later Silver Age stories he instead used a magical cane which could manipulate shadows. He fought both Garrick and the second Flash, Barry Allen. He was a member of several supervillain teams, including the Injustice Society. Shade was one of three villains used for the first meeting of the two heroes in the famous "Flash of Two Worlds" story, which reintroduced the Golden Age Flash to the Silver Age. He was jailed along with the Thinker and the Fiddler.

In the "Crisis on Earth-S" story, King Kull paired Shade up with Doctor Light, Joker of Earth-Two, and Weeper II of Earth-S to wipe out humanity on Earth-S. With Doctor Light he causes perpetual night and darkness on either side of the planet, but is met by Bulletman and Hawkman.

Post-Crisis
The Shade returned in print in 1986, as a member of the Wizard's new incarnation of the Injustice Society. The Shade's next appearance was in a flashback story in Secret Origins #50 (1989), which presented a post-Crisis retelling of "Flash of Two Worlds".

Post-Zero Hour
After Zero Hour, the Shade's origin was changed drastically. The Shade was retconned to an English gentleman named Richard Swift, a young man in the year 1838. One night in London, Swift is trapped amidst an unexplained mystical tragedy, which killed 104 people. The most immediate effect on him is the permanent loss of his memories prior to the incident. Coincidentally, a passerby named Piers Ludlow offers to take in Swift while he recovers. The whole affair is a setup; the Ludlow family is in fact a band of killers and swindlers, who have grown wealthy killing their wealthy business partners and then killing a vagrant in the vicinity to give the impression of a failed robbery/homicide. Before they can make Swift their next scapegoat, he reflexively unleashes his shadows, killing all the present Ludlows. Only a young pair of twins, absent from the excursion, survive. The following evening Swift meets one of his true friends, the author Charles Dickens.

Decades later, Swift is ambushed by Rupert Ludlow, one of the surviving twins. Rupert and his sister have been plotting revenge for years, going so far as to raise their children as future assassins. Though grievously injured, Swift manages to kill Ludlow, as his shadow power has made him both immortal and resistant to injury. Afterward, he leaves England and starts a career as an adventurer/assassin/observer on life, which spans whole continents and leads him to many adventures. While traveling, he meets Brian Savage (Scalphunter) and visits Opal City for the first time. He establishes himself in Opal, acquiring real estate and generally living well, even encountering Oscar Wilde. During his journeys, he meets a similar immortal born of the same incident and bearing his same powers, a dwarf by the name of Simon Culp, who becomes his mortal enemy.

During all of the Shade's escapades, he is pursued by the Ludlows, whom he kills by the dozens. He is nearly killed by one Ludlow, Marguerite Croft, when he falls in love with her in Paris during the 1930s. She tries to kill Shade with poison, but is unsuccessful. Shade survives and is forced to kill Marguerite when she confesses that though she loves him, her loyalty to her family would force her to make more attempts on his life. This leaves Shade with a sense of general depression and the feeling he could never love again. Because of this and the death of Brian Savage, he resumes his activities as an assassin.

During World War II, he leaves America to defend England, and fights Simon Culp again. An exploding bomb causes Culp's body to fuse inside Shade's body. Unaware of this, the Shade returns to Keystone City. This was the time of the Golden Age of Heroes, and of them all he chooses Jay Garrick, the first Flash, as his adversary. During this time, Culp is able to subtly affect the Shade's behavior, and was even able to take over Shade's body completely when the latter is tired.

When the Flash retires in the 1950s, a new hero called the Spider takes his place. Shade investigates the Spider's background and discovers he is both a criminal (using his role to get rid of the competition) and a Ludlow by birth. Ludlow's move to Keystone City was part of his plan to kill the Shade. Shade instead kills the Spider, and rescues Flash and his wife from a murder attempt.

During the 1960s, Shade briefly teams up with Doctor Fate to take down one of Culp's criminal ventures, a mystic organization called the Wise Fools, who wished to repeat the ritual that created him by summoning a wild, uncontrolled bubble of shadow (actually Culp's shadow, separated from the Shade by Culp). Unaware that Culp's consciousness is actually within the Shade, he and Dr. Fate destroy the Wise Fools operation and throw the bubble into an empty dimension (where it continues to grow in power and size). This was all part of Culp's larger plan, one which almost culminates in the destruction of Opal City.

Starman (vol. 2)
James Robinson gave the character a starring role in his new Starman series in 1994. In the first story arc, Sins of the Father, Jack believes Shade to be his enemy when he kidnaps Jack's father, retired Starman Ted Knight, on the orders of the senile Mist, who wishes for a final showdown. Shade later betrays the Mist by allying himself with the O'Dare family, a clan of police officers who assist Jack in the memory of their father Billy O'Dare, a policeman who had often assisted the original Starman. Shade, with the O'Dares, assaults the Mist's hideout and rescues Ted Knight. Shade befriends the family's "black sheep", Matt O'Dare.

Much of the Shade's past is revealed through journal entries included in the Starman comics, including the flashback issues called "Times Past". They often deal with different Starmen, including Jack's father Ted, as well as other characters from the Starman mythos, such as Brian Savage. There were a total of 10 "Times Past" issues in the 80-issue series. "Excerpts" from the Shade's journal often replaced the Starman letters column, frequently giving additional background related to the story or background into Shade's motivations. These excerpts are written as prose, as opposed to a more traditional comic style, with occasional illustrations, and as journal entries being written by the Shade himself at different points in his existence.

Shade has an active part in an adventure of Jack's involving a demon hidden within a poster that can snatch innocent people and drag them into Hell. Shade does not like Merritt, the human guardian of the poster, who has gained immortality for his protection of it, and was the inspiration for Wilde's The Picture of Dorian Gray. In a fight for possession of the poster, Matt O'Dare is dragged within and Shade follows. Inside the poster, Shade, Jack and Matt separately agree to sell their souls in exchange for the liberation of all the souls contained within. The demon, unable to accept a selfless deal, is forced to release everyone (but takes Merritt's soul instead). Matt decides to turn over a new leaf and put his crooked past behind him. Shade assists him in his efforts, while influenced by the revelation that O'Dare is the reincarnated lawman Scalphunter, who happens to be an old friend.

A particularly important point in the life of Shade comes when he meets the demon-lord Neron. Neron offers, as he has done so with many supervillains before him, to enhance Shade's power. Shade sees little use in Neron's offer, as he has no need to increase his already substantial wealth, sees no way of heightening his shadows' power and is already immortal. Neron, angered by his rejection, swears vengeance against Shade.

Over the years the Ludlow attacks have dwindled. This lasts until the wife of the last Ludlow calls him to talk her husband out of attempting an attack that would certainly cost him his life. Shade talks Ludlow out of pursuing his family's vendetta, burying a legacy of hate that has lasted more than 150 years.

Another notable point during the series' run came when the Godwave struck the DC universe, depowering almost all superheroes. In a confrontation between Starman, Matt O'Dare, Green Lantern, and the Infernal Doctor Pip, Pip almost blows up a large section of an Opal skyscraper, but Shade appears at the last minute and draws Pip into the Darklands, which serve as his power source, before the bomb can explode.

At various times, Culp is able to take control over or subtly influence Shade. At one point, Culp takes full control to talk to Jack, in the process making a mistake about the name of a Wilde story. Around the time Jack returns from space in the "Stars, My Destination" story arc, Culp is able to assume full control over Shade's body for an extended period of time and imprison or neutralize most of Opal City's heroes in a bid to loot and destroy Opal - with seemingly no motive other than to destroy what Shade loves most. Gathering an army of villains whom Jack has battled over the course of the series, Culp absorbs Shade's powers, in addition to the shadow force Shade and Dr. Fate had exiled decades before, to cast a spell allowing him to trap Opal City in an impenetrable bubble of shadow and force a confrontation with the city's heroes. Many of the supervillains helping Culp have been gathered by either Neron, the still-vengeful daughter of the Mist, or one of the last Ludlows in existence: the son of the false hero the Spider. This story is the climax of the series, told in the "Grand Guignol" story arc.

Shade eventually is able to cast out Culp, while losing his shadow powers in the process. However, Culp underestimates the Shade, and is tricked into allowing a small shadow imp loyal to Shade to be absorbed into his own shadow, leading to a battle of wills in which Shade draws all the darkness into himself, leaving Culp powerless. Culp attempts to buy his freedom by threatening the younger Mist, but is killed by the elder Mist. This is a turning point for Shade, as he now has freedom of choice, and is able to decide whether he wishes to remain a villain or become a true hero. He is present at the final showdown with the Mist and leaves the building with Ralph Dibny, Jack and Theo Kyle Knight.

Post-Starman (vol. 2)
Since the end of the Starman (vol. 2) series, the Shade has made cameo appearances in several comic series, including Green Arrow and JSA and was listed alongside magical-based villains such as Felix Faust and Circe. He also has a brief appearance in DC's Brave New World in 2006. During the Infinite Crisis, he is seen using his powers to help Opal citizens by protecting the buildings they are in (though, in a remark full of his trademark cynicism, he comments he is not doing it to save the citizens themselves, but, rather, he is "saving the architecture").

He shows up in Robinson's Justice League: Cry for Justice, waiting for his old rival Jay Garrick in his home. He informs Garrick that the insane supervillain Prometheus has ordered a series of attacks on various superheroes (including Batwoman, Barry Allen, Crimson Avenger, and Stargirl) to distract them from a sinister master plan. Shade accompanies Jay to the JLA Watchtower to warn the other heroes of the impending doom. He and Jay arrive at the Watchtower just as Prometheus (who had disguised himself as Freddy Freeman and defeated the entire League) attempts to escape. Though Jay is easily floored, the Shade proves difficult to defeat, and ultimately ends up stopping Donna Troy from killing the supervillain after he has been beaten into submission. The Shade later creates a portal that gives Green Arrow access to Prometheus' otherdimensional lair, where the archer kills Prometheus in revenge for Star City, the dismemberment of his former protege Red Arrow, and the death of Red Arrow's daughter.

During the Blackest Night storyline, Shade is in a relationship with Hope O'Dare, and claims that he is in love with her. After a night of sex, Shade and Hope are confronted by David Knight, reanimated as a Black Lantern. David rips out Shade's heart, but, due to his powers, he survives as he is unable to be killed, which allows Shade to resist the call of a black ring that seeks to turn him into another undead Lantern. After David threatens to kill Hope and later Jack, an enraged Shade uses his powers to trap the Black Lantern within the Shadowlands after decrying the Lantern as a mockery and a fake, saying he has "no light of his own", and uses his own heart as a channel to bind and banish him. Afterwards, Hope admits that she loves Shade as well, and they depart from the scene of the battle.

Shortly after the events of "Blackest Night", the Shade is approached by Hal Jordan and Barry Allen, and he takes them to the Ghost Zone where they find the rotting corpse of Prometheus.

During Brightest Day, Jay Garrick arrives at the Shade's home with Doctor Mid-Nite, Sebastian Faust, and Wildcat to see if he can help track down the missing Obsidian, who possesses abilities similar to those of the Shade. After entering the house, the JSA members find Obsidian and Doctor Fate standing over the Shade's comatose body. Obsidian, now possessed by a cosmic entity known as the Starheart, tells the heroes that the Shade would have told them his "secrets", and that the Starheart commanded that he and Fate silence him. Following the defeat of the Starheart, Congorilla mentions that the Shade has been missing since his assault at the hands of Obsidian, and that nobody has been able to contact him.

Shade's disappearance is explained shortly after this, when it is revealed that he had been captured and brainwashed by Eclipso. Realizing that Shade could turn the tide of the battle, Saint Walker sends the Atom and Starman inside his body to fight off the effects of Eclipso's brainwashing. The heroes narrowly manage to free the Shade's mind, and he turns against Eclipso and ultimately helps the Justice League defeat the villain once and for all.

The New 52
In September 2011, The New 52 rebooted DC's continuity. In this new timeline, a 12-issue series has the Shade survive an assassination attempt, then travel the world to uncover the people behind it. Along the way he deals with his past before the shadows, as well as the encounters he had with his descendants through the years. It is also explained how he first met Culp, and exactly how he gained the shadow powers.

DC Rebirth
In 2016, DC Comics implemented another relaunch of its books called "DC Rebirth", which restored its continuity to a form much as it was prior to "The New 52". Iris West, Barry Allen and Wally West II get sucked into the Shadowlands. Separated from Iris, Barry and Wally meet up with the Shade, who reveals he has lost control of his shadows. His shadows have also kidnapped Hope, and both she and Iris are corrupted by the Shade's darkness. The Flashes and Shade are able to free Hope and Iris from the shadows, with the Shade regaining his powers as well as reconciling with Hope O'Dare.

Possible futures
During the Starman story arc "Stars, My Destination" Jack is thrown by a shadowy corridor created by a future Shade across time and space into a future where Shade's powers overtake him due to a disease that Culp had infected him with during their final battle. His shadow begins expanding into the universe and threatens areas protected by the Legion. Rescuing him, the future Shade explains how Jack may be able to stop it from ever happening by using his cosmic rod on him in the past. He later opens another time portal to allow Jack to journey across time again to reach his destination, Throneworld. In the final issue of Starman, Jack apparently is able to stop the disease before it has the chance to affect Shade; whether this actually changes the future is never revealed.

Starman Annual #1 shows a possible future for Shade as the protector of a Utopian planet thousands of years from the present. As with the current Shade, he enjoys telling tales of his past. The planet's technology and possibly the planet itself seemed to be made almost entirely out of Cosmic Rod technology inspired by Starman and his legacy.

Powers and abilities
Shade is, at present, one of the best, if not the ultimate, channeler of the power of the Shadowlands, which is a quasi-sentient, extra-dimensional mass of malleable darkness. He can use it for many effects, both as an absence of light and a solid substance: he can summon and control "demons", project as shields and conjure areas of complete darkness, create all kinds of constructs out of shadows, transport himself and others through it over great distances, and can use it as a prison dimension. The darkness itself can be dispelled by sufficiently bright blasts of light or energy. Eventually, his experience with the shadows allows him to create corridors through time. The shadows have also granted Shade agelessness and immortality. Dr. Fate once remarked that even the Spectre would have serious difficulty dealing with the Shade, possibly due to the origin of his powers (the former realm of a divine entity on par with God). He is heavily resistant to damage, as seen when a demolition bomb falls on him, leaving him only slightly dazed. Even with his heart torn out of his chest by Black Lantern David Knight, he remained alive and unable to die.

His only weakness (if it can be called such) is the fact that if he loses his shadow, he becomes vulnerable. However, this can only occur if a survivor from the same event in 1838 drains him of it, or in the event of a light strong enough to completely surround him to the point that he is unable to cast a shadow. Prometheus was briefly able to stun Shade with a brief burst of light.

Other versions
 On Earth-33, there is a magician called Shade, with the same powers as the main universe Shade. He is a member of the League of Shamans.
 The Shade (possibly of Earth-3) is an alternate version of the heroine Nightshade. She shares with him his namesake and all his powers, and she wears a top hat and a cane. She is killed by Eve of the Shadows, another Nightshade counterpart. The possibility exists that this Shade is actually a female version of Shade from the gender-reversed world Earth-11.

In other media

Television

Animation
 The Shade appears in series set in the DC Animated Universe (DCAU), voiced by Stephen McHattie. As in the Silver Age comics, this version's powers are a product of his cane and is powerless without it. 
 He first appears in Justice League as a member of Lex Luthor's Injustice Gang and Gorilla Grodd's Secret Society.
 In Justice League Unlimited, Shade makes non-speaking appearances as part of Gorilla Grodd's new Secret Society, which is later taken over by Luthor. When Grodd mounts a mutiny to retake control, Shade sides with him, only to be killed by Darkseid.
 Shade appears in Young Justice, voiced by Joel Swetow. This version's appearance is inspired by the DCAU incarnation. In the episode "Triptych", he was an unwilling part of Simon Stagg's metahuman trafficking operation before being freed by Cheshire. As of the episode "Artemis Through the Looking Glass", Shade joined the League of Shadows, though he later leaves them in the episode "I Know Why the Caged Cat Sings" as a favor to Cheshire and goes freelance.

Live-action
 A variation of Shade appears in a self-titled episode of The Flash, portrayed by Mike McLeod. This version is a nameless man who had the power to vibrate his body to the point where it resembles a giant shadow of varying length. Shade is sent by Doctor Alchemy to lure the Flash out of S.T.A.R. Labs so Alchemy can corrupt Wally West. Shade distracts the speedster by attacking a Central City park, but the Flash and his team defeat him by shining a number of car lights on him before nullifying his powers with power-dampening handcuffs.
 Shade appears in Stargirl, portrayed by an uncredited actor in season one and Jonathan Cake in seasons two and three. This version was originally a thief and conman employed by a cabal called the Men of Tears in the 1800s. Swift acquired the Black Diamond for their plot to summon and bind Eclipso to their will, but they betrayed Swift by attempting to use him as a sacrifice. Unbeknownst to the Men of Tears however, the Black Diamond Swift gave them was a forgery and Eclipso was already bound to the real version, which led to the ritual being botched and a doorway to the Shadowlands being opened. The resulting energy that emerged entered Swift and granted him his powers. By the end of the 20th century, Swift aligned himself with the Injustice Society of America (ISA) as part of a "temporary arrangement" despite viewing its leader Icicle as insane. In the pilot episode, Swift joined the ISA in attacking the Justice Society of America (JSA), during which he pretended to fight and attempted to save Doctor Mid-Nite, but accidentally lost him in the Shadowlands. In the episode "Wildcat", Icicle and Dragon King discuss how Swift had betrayed the ISA in an unknown fashion. In the episode "Stars and S.T.R.I.P.E." Pt. 2, an unimpressed Swift watches a news report discussing the aftermath of his former group's failed attack on the United States from the abandoned ISA hideout. In season two, Swift arrives in Blue Valley to find the Black Diamond. After being confronted by Stargirl's JSA, Swift reveals his reasons for being with the ISA, denies killing Mid-Nite, and demands to be left alone, claiming he will leave peacefully once he gets what he wants. While a battle ensues, Swift subdues the heroes before escaping. In a later confrontation, he reveals to Stargirl that Eclipso murdered Mid-Nite's daughter Rebecca. After receiving help from Stargirl's mother, Barbara Whitmore, Swift intervenes during a fight between the JSA and Injustice Unlimited in an attempt to destroy the Black Diamond. However, Stargirl inadvertently breaks it and frees Eclipso, who forces Swift to flee. Eventually, Swift resurfaces to aid Stargirl in reconstructing the Black Diamond, claiming it can be used to trap Eclipso once more. He later reveals his deception, using the diamond to strengthen his powers and summon Eclipso, who sends Stargirl to the Shadowlands. Subsequently, Swift seeks a darkened theater to recuperate. Barbara and her husband Pat Dugan find and convince him to open a portal to the Shadowlands so that Stargirl, Mid-Nite, and Cindy Burman can escape. The effort seemingly kills Swift, but he later returns to help the JSA defeat Eclipso. In season three, Shade enlists Courtney and Pat to help Jennie-Lynn Hayden reunite with her brother Todd Rice, whom he takes under his wing. Ten years later, he finds work as a tour guide at a JSA museum.

Video games
The Shade appears as a playable character in Lego DC Super-Villains, voiced by Christopher Swindle.

References

Comics characters introduced in 1942
Dickens, Charles
DC Comics superheroes
DC Comics supervillains
Earth-Two
Fictional people from London
Golden Age supervillains
Fictional characters who can manipulate darkness or shadows
Characters created by Gardner Fox
Fictional characters with immortality
Flash (comics) characters